The ground rollers are a small family of non-migratory  near-passerine birds restricted to Madagascar. 
They are related to the kingfishers, bee-eaters and rollers. They most resemble the latter group, and are sometimes considered a sub-family of the true rollers.

Description

They are more terrestrial than Coracidae species, and this is reflected in their longer legs and shorter, more rounded wings.

They lack the highly colourful appearance of the true rollers, and are duller in appearance, with striped or flecked plumage. They are much more elusive and shy than their relatives, and are normally difficult to find in the Malagasy forests. Often the hooting breeding call is all that betrays their presence.

These birds nest as solitary pairs in holes in the ground which they excavate themselves, unlike the true rollers, which rarely nest in ground holes and even then do not dig their own nests.

Systematics

mtDNA analyses confirmed the systematics of this group but indicated that merging Geobiastes into Brachypteracias, as was usually done since the 1960s, should be reversed at least until a more comprehensive review (e.g. supported by fossils) is possible (Kirchman et al., 2001). Also, 2000-year-old subfossil remains of ground rollers are known from the Holocene of Ampoza (Goodman, 2000); Eocene remains from Europe at first tentatively assigned to this family were later recognized as quite distinct (Mayr & Mourer-Chauviré 2000). Presently, there is no indication that ground rollers ever occurred anywhere outside Madagascar (Mayr & Mourer-Chauviré, 2001).

Species

There are six known species in four known genera in the family Brachypteraciidae:

References

Kirchman, Jeremy J.; Hackett, Shannon J.; Goodman, Steven M. & Bates, John M. (2001): Phylogeny and systematics of ground rollers (Brachypteraciidae) of Madagascar, Auk 118(4): 849–863. DOI: 10.1642/0004-8038(2001)118[0849:PASOGR]2.0.CO;2 HTML abstract
Mayr, Gerald & Mourer-Chauviré, Cécile (2000): Rollers (Aves: Coraciiformes. s.s.) from the Middle Eocene of Messel (Germany) and the Upper Eocene of the Quercy (France). J. Vertebr. Paleontol. 20(3): 533–546. DOI:10.1671/0272-4634(2000)020[0533:RACSSF]2.0.CO;2 PDF fulltext
Mayr, Gerald & Mourer-Chauviré, Cécile (2003): Phylogeny and fossil record of the Brachypteraciidae: A comment on Kirchman et al. (2001). Auk 120(1): 202–203. DOI: 10.1642/0004-8038(2003)120[0202:PAFROT]2.0.CO;2 PDF fulltext
Goodman, S.M. (2000). A description of a new species of Brachypteracias (Family Brachypteraciidae) from the Holocene of Madagascar. Ostrich 71 (1 & 2):p 318–322

External links
Ground roller videos on the Internet Bird Collection
Don Roberson's Bird Families of the World

Coraciiformes
Endemic birds of Madagascar
Taxa named by Charles Lucien Bonaparte